Hexabromocyclododecane (HBCD or HBCDD) is a brominated flame retardant. It consists of twelve carbon, eighteen hydrogen, and six bromine atoms tied to the ring. Its primary application is in extruded (XPS) and expanded (EPS) polystyrene foam that is used as thermal insulation in the building industry. Other uses are upholstered furniture, automobile interior textiles, car cushions and insulation blocks in trucks, packaging material, video cassette recorder housing and electric and electronic equipment. According to UNEP, "HBCD is produced in China, Europe, Japan, and the USA. The known current annual production is approximately 28,000 tonnes per year. The main share of the market volume is used in Europe and China" (figures from 2009 to 2010). Due to its persistence, toxicity, and ecotoxicity, the Stockholm Convention on Persistent Organic Pollutants decided in May 2013 to list hexabromocyclododecane in Annex A to the convention with specific exemptions for production and use in expanded polystyrene and extruded polystyrene in buildings. Because HBCD has 16 possible stereo-isomers with different biological activities, the substance poses a difficult problem for manufacture and regulation.

Toxicity
HBCD's toxicity and its harm to the environment are current sources of concern. HBCD can be found in environmental samples such as birds, mammals, fish and other aquatic organisms as well as soil and sediment.
On this basis, on 28 October 2008 the European Chemicals Agency decided to include HBCD in the SVHC list, Substances of Very High Concern, within the Registration, Evaluation, Authorisation and Restriction of Chemicals framework. On 18 February 2011, HBCD was listed in the Annex XIV of REACH and hence is subject to Authorisation. HBCD can be used until the so-called “sunset date” (21 August 2015). After that date, only authorised applications will be allowed in the EU.

HBCD has been found widely present in biological samples from remote areas and supporting evidences for its classification as Persistent, Bioaccumulative and Toxic (PBT) and undergoes long-range environmental transportation.
In July 2012, an EU harmonised classification and labelling for HBCD entered into force. HBCD has been classified as a category 2 for reproductive toxicity. Since August 2010 hexabromocyclododecanes are included in the EPA's List of Chemicals of Concern.
In May 2013 the Stockholm Convention on Persistent Organic Pollutants (POPs) decided to include HBCD in the convention's Annex A for elimination, with specific exemptions for expanded and extruded polystyrene in buildings needed to give countries time to phase-in safer substitutes. HBCD is listed for elimination, but with a specific exemption for expanded polystyrene (EPS) and extruded polystyrene (XPS) in buildings. Countries may choose to use this exemption for up to five years after the request for exemption is submitted. Japan was the first country to implement a ban on the import and production of HBCD effective in May 2014.

Because HBCD has 16 possible stereo-isomers with different biological activities, the substance poses a difficult problem for manufacture and regulation.
The HBCD commercial mixture is composed of three main diastereomers denoted as alpha (α-HBCD), beta (β-HBCD) and gamma (γ-HBCD) with traces of others. A series of four published in vivo mice studies were conducted between several federal and academic institutions to characterize the toxicokinetic profiles of individual HBCD stereoisomers. The predominant diastereomer in the HBCD  mixture, γ-HBCD, undergoes rapid hepatic metabolism, fecal and urinary elimination, and biological conversion to other diastereomers with a short biological half-life of 1–4 days. After oral exposure to the γ-HBCD diastereomer, β-HBCD was detected in the liver and brain, and α-HBCD and β-HBCD was detected in the fat and feces  with multiple novel metabolites identified - monohydroxy-pentabromocyclododecane, monohydroxy-pentabromocyclododecene, dihydroxy-pentabromocyclododecene, and dihydroxy-pentabromocyclododecadiene. In contrast, α-HBCD is more biologically persistent, resistant to metabolism, bioaccumulates in lipid-rich tissues after a 10-day repeated exposure study, and has a longer biological half-life of up to 21 days; only α-HBCD was detected in the liver, brain, fat and feces with no stereoisomerization to γ-HBCD or β-HBCD and low trace levels of four different hydroxylated metabolites were identified. Developing mice had higher HBCD tissue levels than adult mice after exposure to either α-HBCD or γ-HBCD indicating the potential for increased susceptibility of the developing young to HBCD effects. The reported toxicokinetic differences of individual HBCD diastereoisomers have important implications for the extrapolation of toxicological studies of the commercial HBCD mixture to the assessment of human risk.

Environmental Concerns

Due to its persistence, toxicity, and ecotoxicity, the Stockholm Convention on Persistent Organic Pollutants decided in May 2013 to list hexabromocyclododecane in Annex A to the convention with specific exemptions for production and use in expanded polystyrene and extruded polystyrene in buildings. Countries may choose to use this exemption for up to five years after the request for exemption is submitted.

There is a large and still increasing stock of HBCD in the anthroposphere, mainly in EPS and XPS insulation boards.
A long term environmental monitoring programme run by the Fraunhofer Institute for Molecular Biology and Applied Ecology demonstrates a general trend that HBCD concentrations are decreasing over time.  HBCD emissions into the environment are controlled under the voluntary industry emission management programme: the Voluntary Emissions Control Action Programme (VECAP). The VECAP annual report demonstrates continuous decrease of potential emissions of HBCD to the environment.

References

External links

 MPI Milebrome B-972, FR 50 & GC SAM: The low cost alternatives to Hexabromocyclododecane (HBCD) in EPS and XPS applications, Stockholm Convention on Persistent Organic Pollutants 2012
 An Overview of Alternatives to Tetrabromobisphenol A (TBBPA) and Hexabromocyclododecane (HBCD), University of Massachusetts Lowell, March 2006
 ECHA: MEMBER STATE COMMITTEE SUPPORT DOCUMENT FOR IDENTIFICATION OF HEXABROMOCYCLODODECANE AND ALL MAJOR DIASTEREOISOMERS IDENTIFIED AS A SUBSTANCE OF VERY HIGH CONCERN, 8 October 2008
 Factsheet BSEF
 BSEF – the bromine industry website’s page on HBCD 

Flame retardants
Organobromides
PBT substances
Persistent organic pollutants under the Stockholm Convention